The Nameless One may refer to:

The Nameless One, protagonist of the computer role-playing game Planescape: Torment
Nameless One (comics), several characters in comic books
The Nameless One (novel), a 2014 novel by Paul Stewart and Chris Riddell
"The Nameless One" (song), a 1993 single by Wendy James
The Nameless One, arch-villain of the Pellinor fantasy series by Allison Croggon